Joris Gnagnon (born 13 January 1997) is a French professional footballer who plays as a centre-back.

Club career

Rennes
Born in Bondy next to Paris, Gnagnon is a youth exponent from Stade Rennais. He made his Ligue 1 debut on 16 January 2016 against Troyes AC, playing the entire second half. He scored his first Ligue 1 goal on 28 January 2017, in a Derby Breton against Nantes to draw the game in the 86th minute.

Sevilla
On 25 July 2018, Gnagnon joined Spanish side Sevilla FC for five years. Gnagnon came under criticism in July 2019 after aggressively kicking Liverpool player Yasser Larouci in a pre-season friendly in Boston, causing the 18 year old to leave the pitch on a stretcher and Gnagnon to be given a red card.

On 26 August 2019, Gnagnon returned to Rennes on a one year loan deal.

On 22 September 2021, Gnagnon was sacked by Sevilla for a lack of professionalism with the club citing concerns about his discipline and physical fitness.

Saint-Étienne
After being released from his contract with Sevilla, Gnagnon signed with French side Saint-Étienne on 26 November 2021. He failed to make a competitive appearance for the club before leaving by mutual consent in May 2022.

International career
On 25 March 2017, Gnagnon made his debut for the France under-20 team. His first ever game for a French youth team.

He later chose to represent the Ivory Coast national team, for whom he is eligible through his family's Ivorian origins. He was called up to the Ivory Coast national team for the first time on 19 May 2017.

However, he never made an appearance for the African nation and stated in May 2018 that he had not ruled out playing for the European country at senior level, despite switching allegiance to Ivory Coast the previous year. He was subsequently called up by the France under-21 team for friendlies against Switzerland and Italy in May 2018.

Career statistics

References

External links

 
 

1997 births
Living people
Sportspeople from Bondy
French footballers
France youth international footballers
French sportspeople of Ivorian descent
French expatriate sportspeople in Spain
French expatriate footballers
Expatriate footballers in Spain
Association football defenders
Ligue 1 players
La Liga players
Stade Rennais F.C. players
Sevilla FC players
AS Saint-Étienne players
Footballers from Seine-Saint-Denis